Anil Panachooran (1965–2021) was an Indian poet and lyricist, who worked predominantly in the Malayalam film industry and Malayalam poetry. He was a lawyer by profession. He had written more than 200 songs in the Malayalam film industry.  While undergoing treatment for COVID-19, he died on 3 January 2021, following a cardiac arrest.

Filmography 

*He penned his last lyrics for the movie Within Seconds(2021).

References 

Indian filmographies